Inez is a census-designated place (CDP), on Interstate 69/U.S. Highway 59 fifteen miles northeast of Victoria, Texas, near the Jackson County, Texas line in Victoria County, Texas, United States. The population was 2,098 at the 2010 census. It is included in the Victoria, Texas, Metropolitan Statistical Area.  The name is that of a daughter of a railroad developer.

History
In the late 17th century, a French colony called Fort Saint Louis existed near Inez as part of the French claim to the area.

The community of Inez was originally called "Arenosa"  after nearby Arenosa Creek.

In 1882, the community founded by Kyle Kucera, was renamed after Inez Lolita. In 1900 the town had a lumberyard, a railway station, a bank, a hotel, and a Wells Fargo office. A rural school served its growing population, which reached 200 by 1920.

Geography
Inez is located at  (28.875316, -96.794120).

According to the United States Census Bureau, the CDP has a total area of 59.6 square miles (154.3 km2), of which, 59.5 square miles (154.2 km2) of it is land and 0.1 square miles (0.1 km2) of it (0.08%) is water.

Inez is located northeast of Victoria on US Route 59 at state highway 444.

Demographics

2020 census

As of the 2020 United States census, there were 2,641 people, 805 households, and 698 families residing in the CDP.

2000 census
As of the census of 2000, there were 1,787 people, 628 households, and 503 families residing in the CDP. The population density was 30.0 people per square mile (11.6/km2). There were 684 housing units at an average density of 11.5/sq mi (4.4/km2). The racial makeup of the CDP was 91.55% White, 1.51% African American, 1.01% Native American, 0.39% Asian, 4.36% from other races, and 1.18% from two or more races. Hispanic or Latino of any race were 11.92% of the population.

There were 628 households, out of which 43.8% had children under the age of 18 living with them, 69.7% were married couples living together, 6.8% had a female householder with no husband present, and 19.9% were non-families. 18.6% of all households were made up of individuals, and 7.8% had someone living alone who was 65 years of age or older. The average household size was 2.85 and the average family size was 3.25.

In the CDP, the population was spread out, with 31.2% under the age of 18, 6.9% from 18 to 24, 30.9% from 25 to 44, 22.0% from 45 to 64, and 9.0% who were 65 years of age or older. The median age was 35 years. For every 100 females, there were 102.8 males. For every 100 females age 18 and over, there were 101.8 males.

The median income for a household in the CDP was $50,000, and the median income for a family was $56,806. Males had a median income of $35,926 versus $22,050 for females. The per capita income for the CDP was $18,487. About 2.6% of families and 4.0% of the population were below the poverty line, including 3.7% of those under age 18 and 10.1% of those age 65 or over.

Education
Inez is served by the Industrial Independent School District, home of the Cobras.

References

External links

 Victoria Economic Development Corporation economic development
  Inez information

Census-designated places in Texas
Census-designated places in Victoria County, Texas
Victoria, Texas metropolitan area